Therese Benedek (November 8, 1892 – October 27, 1977) was a Hungarian-American psychoanalyst, researcher, and educator. Active in Germany and the United States between the years 1921 and 1977, she was regarded for her work on psychosomatic medicine, women's psychosexual development, sexual dysfunction, and family relationships. She was a faculty and staff member of the Chicago Institute for Psychoanalysis from 1936 to 1969.

Early life and education
Therese Friedmann was born in Eger, Hungary, to a traditional Jewish family. Her parents were Ignatius Friedmann and Charlotte Link Friedmann, and she had one brother and two sisters. When she was six years old, her family moved to Budapest. She was the only one of her siblings to receive a university education, graduating from the University of Budapest with a doctorate in medicine in 1916. She was a participant of the Galileo Circle.

Career
Benedek initially decided to pursue a career in child psychology and study the effects of maternal separation on infant emotions. She completed the requirements for a residency in pediatrics in 1918 and began working as an assistant physician at the St. Elizabeth University pediatric clinic in Bratislava. She left this position in 1919 and married shortly afterward. Having taken courses from Hungarian psychoanalyst Sándor Ferenczi, an associate of Sigmund Freud, during her university days, she decided to switch her career track to psychoanalysis. She underwent a five-month training analysis with Ferenczi before leaving Budapest.

In 1920 she and her new husband relocated to Germany to escape the political upheaval in Hungary. In 1920 she became an assistant physician at the Neurological-Psychiatric Clinic of the University of Leipzig and in 1921 opened the city's first private psychoanalytic practice, becoming a training analyst. From 1933 to 1935 she was a training and supervisory analyst at the Berlin Psychoanalytic Institute.

Although as a Jew she was a target of the Nazi Party in Germany in the mid-1930s, Benedek did not feel the need to emigrate, since she considered herself a Hungarian rather than a Jew. Nevertheless, in 1936 her husband convinced her to leave Germany and accept the offer of Franz Alexander to work as a training analyst for the Chicago Institute for Psychoanalysis. She was a faculty and staff member, engaging in teaching, supervising, and research at the institute, for the next 34 years. She acquired her U.S. medical license in 1937 and her U.S. citizenship in 1943. Her husband joined the faculty of Northwestern University School of Medicine.

Research
Benedek is said to have "played a central role in the development of psychoanalysis in the United States". Influenced by the theories of hysteria promulgated by Freud, her early research had sought a link between psychological and endocrinal factors for such problems as anxiety, aggression, and diabetes. In the United States, working with endocrinologist Boris B. Rubinstein, she conducted extensive studies on the correlation between ovulation and female emotions, resulting in the 1942 book The Sexual Cycle in Women. Benedek explored a link between the estrogen/progesterone cycle and a woman's desire to engage in sexual intercourse, nurture a pregnancy, and raise children. She also described the "modern" woman's struggle with her natural maternal role. Benedek's analysis of the "un-motherly modern mother" was widely praised and included in psychology and medical teaching manuals.

Benedek also studied the effects of gender equality and democracy on relationships between spouses and their children. Her 1949 paper Parenthood as a Developmental Phase: A contribution to the libido theory rejected the prevailing theory that psychological development stopped after adolescence; Benedek maintained that it continued throughout parenthood. She published further research on parenthood, family relationships, and depression into her seventies, and continued seeing patients in private practice after her retirement from the Chicago Institute for Psychoanalysis in 1969.

Affiliations
In Germany Benedek was a member of the Berlin Psychoanalytic Society. In the United States she belonged to national and international psychoanalytic organizations and served as president of the Chicago Psychoanalytic Society from 1958 to 1959.

On her eightieth birthday in 1972, the Therese Benedek Research Foundation was established in her honor.

Personal life
In 1919 she married Tibor Benedek, a dermatologist and researcher. She and her husband, a Hungarian Protestant, attended church together regularly. They had one son and one daughter.

She died of a heart attack on October 27, 1977, aged 84. Her husband predeceased her by three years.

Her papers are stored at the Chicago Institute for Psychoanalysis.

Bibliography

Books

 (with Boris Benjamin Rubenstein)

 (with Joan Fleming)
 (with E. James Anthony)
 (with E. James Anthony)

Selected articles

 – collected papers, 1931-1968

References

Sources
 

 

 
 

1892 births
1977 deaths
American psychoanalysts
Jewish psychoanalysts
German psychoanalysts
Jewish Hungarian scientists
Eötvös Loránd University alumni
American people of Hungarian-Jewish descent
People from Eger
People from Chicago
Hungarian emigrants to the United States